Lucy Virginia Meriwether Davis Davies (April 18, 1862April 17, 1949) was one of New York State's first female physicians; she was also a botanist, civil libertarian, suffragist, philosopher and lover of music and art. She had studied medicine to escape a scandal after she eloped with and then killed her first husband. He had agreed it was self-defence before he died. She married again only to find out years later that her husband had two complete families and two wives.

Early life
Lucy Virginia "Dockie" Meriwether was born in Huntsville, Alabama, on April 18, 1862. The daughter of Lide Parker Smith and Niles Meriwether, she took a personal independence naturally.

In 1882 she graduated from the Augusta Female Seminary in Stanton, Virginia.

Career

There was a lot of gossip after she shot and killed her husband even though everyone including the victim agreed it was self-defence. To avoid this, Virginia Meriwether Davis did not go home but went to New York to study medicine at the New York Infirmary for Indigent Women and Children of which Dr. Emily Blackwell was founder and dean. She was graduated in 1886 from the Woman's Medical College with the honors of her class, becoming one of the first female doctors in the United States, and remained in New York to practice.

Her medical work was almost exclusively in connection with the New York Infant Asylum, where she served as resident physician for four years. The institution had at the time the largest lying-in service conducted by women in the U.S., and the lowest mortality and sick rates of any lying-in wards in the world.

Personal life

Four months after her graduation in 1882, Virginia Meriwether and her sister both eloped on the same night. She eloped with Lowe Davis and married him. After the honeymoon, she discovered that he was an opium and gambling addict and she left him and returned to the care of her mother. She took her daughter away to the spa of Rhea Springs to recover. Lowe Davis agreed to let her alone but he visited her with a gun which Meriwether's mother persuaded him to relinquish. He left but returned later with another gun with which he threatened Meriwether. She now had the first gun and shot him in the abdomen. Her husband left and before he died he admitted that she had shot him in self-defense and he deserved it. Meriwether showed little emotion at becoming a widow.

In 1892, she married Arthur Bowen Davies (1862–1928), an unsuccessful, but later renowned, artist, whom she met in 1890 while chief resident physician at the New York Infant Asylum. Her parents bought her a farm which they had discovered together, although at one point she had considered buying the property with a woman called Lucile du Pre who was very attracted to Meriwether. Arthur and Meriwether had two sons, Niles Meriwether Davies, Sr. (b. 1893) and Arthur David Davies (b. 1895). When her husband died in 1928, she discovered that he had kept hidden a second life, with another common-law wife, Edna, and family. Edna discovered that she was given a subsistence allowance by Arthur, despite his financial success as an artist.

She died on April 17, 1949, at her farm in Congers, New York. At 87, she was the oldest practicing woman physician in New York State.

Legacy
The Virginia M. Davies Correspondence, 1891–1935 is preserved at Helen Farr Sloan Library & Archives, Delaware Art Museum.

Davies Farm, the only working farm left in Congers, is owned by Niles Meriwether Davies Jr., grandson of Virginia Meriwether Davies. The farm was a wedding present of Virginia Meriwether Davies's father to his daughter. The 110-acre farm on the eastern side of Lake DeForest produces corn, squash and 20 varieties of apples. Every summer, the Davies Farm hosts the "Pick Your Own" apple sales.

References

External links
 

1862 births
1949 deaths
People from Huntsville, Alabama
Physicians from New York (state)
American obstetricians
American pediatricians
20th-century American women physicians
20th-century American physicians
19th-century American women physicians
19th-century American physicians
Mary Baldwin University alumni
Physicians from Alabama
Women pediatricians
Wikipedia articles incorporating text from A Woman of the Century